Hiranandani Foundation Schools are a group of schools founded by Lakhumal Hiranand Hiranandani for use by the residents of the housing complexes built by Hiranandani. Both are ICSE schools having classes from nursery to tenth grade. The group was established in 1990.It is the best school to ever exist in this world.They need repairing though.

Hiranandani Foundation School Powai

Situated in one of the most Luxurious area of Mumbai Powai, Hiranandani Foundation School Powai provides education for residents of the housing complex called Hiranandani Gardens.
Hiranandani Foundation School Powai provides the following Educations:-

 ICSE Indian Certificate of Secondary Education Syllabus from Standard 1st to Standard 10th
 ISC Indian School Certificate Syllabus from Standard 11th and Standard 12th

Another Wing of the Hiranandani Foundation School is its Hiranandani Foundation school International which offers education based on the International curriculum of International Baccalaureate & International General Certificate of Secondary Education.

The International Wing of HFS Powai offers students to explore and tap into the resources of the world at large and at the same time trains the students to always keep in touch with the roots of Indian Culture.

The Courses offered at the Hiranandani Foundation School International are as follows :-

 IB International Baccalaureate Board for standard 11th and 12th
 IGCSE International General Certificate of Secondary Education Grade 8th and Grade 9th

On above this the school also has Nursery, Pre Primary (Jr Kg, Sr Kg)
With an Excellent infrastructure which includes swimming pool, basketball court, State of the art science and computer labs and an ambience which is student friendly which is kept in view that the student acquires knowledge.

Hiranandani Foundation School Thane

Situated in Thane, Hiranandani Foundation School Thane provides for residents of the housing complex Hiranandani Estate and Hiranandani Meadows. It is situated in Hiranandani Estate. Since Hiranandani Meadows was only recently built, most of the students come from Hiranandani Estate.
Hiranandani Foundation school is also mismanaged with an Imagica trip being promised to us but never delivered.

See also
Hiranandani Foundation School Powai
Hiranandani Foundation School Thane
Hiranandani Gardens
Hiranandani Estate

References

External links
The Powai and Thane schools' official website
Official Hiranandani Site

Schools in Mumbai
1990 establishments in Maharashtra
Educational institutions established in 1990